Stig Johansson may refer to:

 Stig-Göran Johansson (1943–2002), Swedish ice hockey player
 Stig Johansson (linguist) (1939–2010)
 Stig Johansson (water polo) (1924–2007)
 Stig H. Johansson (born 1945), Swedish trotting trainer and former driver